The 1942 Oklahoma gubernatorial election was held on November 3, 1942, and was a race for Governor of Oklahoma. Democrat  Robert S. Kerr defeated Republican William J. Otjen.  Edward W. Fickinger was also on the ballot representing the Prohibition Party. Gomer Griffith Smith and Robert Burns unsuccessfully sought the Democratic nomination.

Results

References

1942
Gubernatorial
Okla